Titanotylopus is an extinct genus of terrestrial herbivore in the family Camelidae, endemic to North America from the late Hemphillian stage of the Miocene through the Irvingtonian stage of the Pleistocene. It was one of the last surviving North American camels, after its extinction, only Camelops remained. Its closest living relative is the Bactrian camel.

Its name is derived from the Greek words Τιτάν, τύλος and πούς — "Titan", "knob" and "foot"; thus, "giant knobby-foot."

Paleobiology

Titanotylopus is distinguished from other early large camelids by its large upper canines and other distinguishing dental characteristics, and absence of lacrimal vacuities in the skull. Unlike the smaller, contemporaneous Camelops, Titanotylopus had relatively broad second phalanges, suggesting that it had true padded "cameltoes," like modern camels.

The species Titanotylopus spatulus was characterized by broad, spatula-like incisors. It has been found at Grand View, Red Light fauna of the Love Formation, Hudspeth County, Texas, Donnelly Ranch, White Rock, Kansas, Mullen II (Kansas), Sandahl Local Fauna (Nebraska), Vallecito Creek, Colorado and 111 Ranch, Arizona in North America.

Appearance
Titanotylopus possessed long and massive limbs, a comparatively small braincase, and a convex slope between the eyes.

Like modern camels, it possessed a hump for fat storage; evidence for this is provided by the long neural spines on its thoracic vertebrae.

Alternate classification
While some authors have considered Gigantocamelus and Titanotylopus to be congeneric, others have maintained them separately. Voorhies and Corner, based on previously unreported material, documented that the two are indeed worthy of separate generic status. Harrison (1985) followed Voorhies and Corner in advocating the use of Titanotylopus for only T. nebraskensis, based on a lower jaw, and Gigantocamelus for G. spatula, which includes G. fricki. There is a clear difference between the proximal phalanx of specimens assigned to Gigantocamelus and to Titanotylopus, based on skeletons associated with skull material.

See also

Aepycamelus
Megacamelus
Oxydactylus
Poebrotherium
Procamelus
Protylopus
Stenomylus
Pleistocene megafauna

References

Further reading
 After the Dinosaurs: The Age of Mammals (Life of the Past) by Donald R. Prothero
 Barry Cox, Colin Harrison, R.J.G. Savage, and Brian Gardiner. (1999): The Simon & Schuster Encyclopedia of Dinosaurs and Prehistoric Creatures: A Visual Who's Who of Prehistoric Life. Simon & Schuster.
 The Book of Life: An Illustrated History of the Evolution of Life on Earth, Second Edition by Stephen Jay Gould
 Classification of Mammals by Malcolm C. McKenna and Susan K. Bell

Prehistoric camelids
Miocene even-toed ungulates
Pliocene even-toed ungulates
Pleistocene even-toed ungulates
Pleistocene genus extinctions
Neogene mammals of North America
Prehistoric even-toed ungulate genera
Taxa named by Erwin Hinckley Barbour
Fossil taxa described in 1934